Sorry, I've Got No Head was a CBBC children's sketch comedy television series. The programme's cast originally consisted of William Andrews, David Armand, James Bachman, Marcus Brigstocke, Anna Crilly, Justin Edwards, Mark Evans, Mel Giedroyc, Marek Larwood, Toby Davies and Nick Mohammed, most of whom also wrote parts of the show.

The first series began in 2008, where sketches included Jasmine and Prudith, who think everything will cost "a thousand pounds", and the Fearsome Vikings, who are scared of everything.

The second series began in 2009 and featured two new cast members; Kobna Holdbrook-Smith and Fergus Craig. Marek Larwood did not appear in this series. New sketches include Embarrassed Louise, who struggles to deal with an unusual problem; an angry Snowman, who battles for equality in everyday life; and a sitcom featuring a family of dung beetles.

The third and final series started in May 2011. Javone Prince and a returning Marek Larwood appeared in the new series. Repeats were shown on CBBC until 2014.

The show started airing on YTV Canada in late 2009, and series 2 started airing in late 2010.

Pixelface, another programme by CBBC, is inspired by the Backstage Access sketches.

Sketches

Introduced in Series 1
Headless Bill, a man with no head who gets into some sticky situations and who gives the show its name. Appears in series 1–2 but not in series 3.
Jasmine and Prudith, who believe everything will cost a thousand pounds, despite what the person they're interacting with says. However, after they encounter the person they say that they will do something that would generally cost at least a thousand pounds, such as buying a mansion or a yacht. Appears in every series.
The Fearsome Vikings who are scared of everything. Appears in every series.
 Emily and Monty Forrest, a brother and sister duo act who try to get a performance in a show, but fail at getting the part when a routine of theirs goes horribly wrong. In series 3, they try to make their own show. Appears in every series.
Advice Man, who tells you really stupid things to not to do that he obviously has done, such as lending your clothes to the Incredible Hulk or spending your pocket money on robotic legs. Appeared in series 1, returned in series 3.
The Witchfinder General, who dresses in clothing of the early 17th century period. Everytime he losts his hat When he finds himself annoyed by some member of the public normally Mel Giedroyc, he points at them and declares them a witch, at which point a mob of peasants come in and carry them away, usually accompanied by the theme tune to The Omen. A parody of the 1968 horror film of the same name. Appears in every series.
Blueberries, where a lady hosting a cooking show flatulates whenever she talks or thinks about blueberries, often with her hair being blown. Appears in every series.
The Outer Hebridean Island of North Barassay, where the school has only one teacher and one pupil. Appears in every series.
The parents. In the first series, they buy their son only half a thing because he hasn't done well enough (i.e. a bike with no wheels or a kite with no sheet) then tell him if he does better they will buy him the other half, to which he asks "Can I go upstairs?". He is seen using the thing later on in the episode. In the second series, they congratulate their son on accomplishing something and treat him into going out, but unfortunately they bring up stuff that they had to pay for, so leave him at home with a babysitter, who is also one of his teachers. In the third series, they try to convince their son not to do what he was going to do, such as play in a football match. The son is swayed at first and decides not to do it, then later changes his mind and tells them firmly that he is going to do it. The father then says he will do something silly like eat his own hat or wear women's clothing if his son does do well. The son ends up telling his parents that he did really well, resulting in the father keeping his promise. Appears in every series. In series 1 and 2 the opening music is Mozart's Eine Kleine Nachtmusik and in series 3, it's Mendelssohn's Italian Symphony, followed shortly after by Haydn's Clock Symphony.
The man or woman who starts out with a simple problem, at which point the narrator points out that he/she is a complete idiot (e.g. trying to dial a potato instead of a phone or using a fish as toilet paper) and starts shouting at him/her. Appears in series 1, returns in series 3.
Harry Bolds, a man who tries to do an extreme activities like canoeing. He first shows off his gear on what he will need for this activity to make sure he is prepared, usually being expensive and excessive items that the 'bloke at the shop' has tricked him into buying. Harry Bolds brings his own odd items also, such as a Kendal Mint Cake or a book 'in case he gets bored'. After he does the activity, however, he is shown in bad condition and says that it's not for him. In series 2, he has an assistant called Terry Brave who, when he says it's not for him, says he 'quite liked it'. Appears in series 1-2
Bee. When something ordinary is going on like someone in a recording studio, someone will always hear a buzzing sound. Another person would ask if there is a bee in here, then the camera will turn to a man dressed up as a bee in the room. The first sketch on the show. Only appeared in series 1.
Steve, a boy who has a time machine which he uses to go into the future to spoil something for his friend Frank just so he can do something he wants, despite promising to go into the future to do something else, such as 'seeing if everyone is still wearing hats in 2015' or 'if he has finished the puzzle he started last October'. In the series finale, he actually does what he said he was going to do. Only appeared in series 1.
Billy, an imaginary friend who throws a fit every time he is offered a real item and not an imaginary item. After Billy throws a fit, his friend and the other person usually leave, to which Billy indulges in the same 'real' thing he rejected. Only appeared in series 1.
The Bluebeards. A pirate family whose son Jim Bluebeard struggles with his life at a Privateer school. Only appeared in series 1.
Goth man. A man who likes and owns everything that's black. Only appeared in series 1.
Shouty Choir. A choir that instead of sings, shouts every single word. Only appeared in series 1.
Timothy and his mother, who try numerous ways to beat the traffic in order to get to school on time, but always fail, causing her to get the car keys. Appears in series 1-2
A father who reads a bedtime story to his son, but the son doesn't buy it and then tells his father something he did that would shock the father seeing as he is 9 years old and unable to do something this grown up, such as landing a plane or helping David Tennant with loss of his sense of taste. Appears in series 1–2.
Marion Clark, a parody of Jeremy Clarkson and Top Gear. Only appeared in series 1.
The Secret Negotiator, a woman that sends messages to a boy in order to convince someone like his parents or his teacher to let him do something like stay up late or change his grade. It usually ends with her persuading the boy to throw a tantrum which would convince them easily, but backfire much later (e.g. he falls asleep in class). Only appeared in series 1.
A man who has various jobs like a bomb disarming officer or a surgeon says to his colleagues that he didn't really want to do this and has had no experience. He then states that he wanted to be something else like a belly dancer or a punk rocker, but is caught by a police officer who "had warned him about this before" and chases after him. Only appeared in series 1.
Paintball Mania! A man who goes around paint balling various people. Only appeared in series 1.
Grunbendior the Magnificent, a wizard that tries to help out with everyday problems, irritating his friends in the process. Only appeared in series 1.
Jones the Sage (Clive the Wise in the series finale), a sage who is asked various questions from the public, but his answer is mainly involving sheep and never really answering the question, subverted in the series 1 finale when he is actually asked a question about sheep. Only appeared in series 1.
Bert and Alf. Two elderly gentleman, who reminisce about one of their long lost friends. They then agree that they would have liked a certain pop star. Only appeared in series 1.
Two men are about to watch a movie on their DVD player, but one of them accidentally selects the language in a different country causing the background to change into a setting from the country and the other guy to dress up as something from that particular country. E.g. Egypt, a mummy. Only appeared in series 1.
The Waveman, a guy who likes to start a Mexican wave in a public place and shouts "boo" when someone doesn't do it. He eventually gets everyone to do the Mexican wave. Appears in series 1-2
 Backstage Access, a sketch that features the daily lives of various video game characters. Appears in series 1–2.
 A father who tries to test his knowledge on various school subjects his son is doing and ends up not knowing anything about by claiming things have changed since his time. Only appears in series 1.
 A mother reads a rhyme to her baby and the father scientifically accurately corrects the sentence of the rhyme she said. Only appears in series 1.
 A police officer who arrests random people for doing normal things such as painting a fence, or eating a packet of crisps. Even after being told by his superior to let these people go, he still leaves his suspects in handcuffs. Only appears in series 1.
 A living angel statue street performer who does unusual antics that fit outside his job description. Only appears in the last two episodes of series 1.

Introduced in Series 2
Embarrassed Louise, who inflates to a great size whenever she is embarrassed and then she explodes. Appears in series 2–3.
The Angry Snowman, who is not allowed near things that get very hot and then accuses people of "discrimination". When he risks the adventure he ends up melting or losing part of his body Appears in series 2–3.
Deer Club, a club of people who dress up and do deer related things. Only appeared in series 2.
The Dung Beetles, a family of dung beetles who behave in a sitcom manner. Only appeared in series 2.
Phillipe Lavavaseur, the French exchange student, who has been living with Danny's father for twenty years and always makes Danny's life a misery. In series 2, Danny tries to get his father to convince him to leave but he has trouble with the language which would make Phillipe believe that he wants to do something with him like go scuba diving. In series 3, Danny finds out that Phillipe can speak English and plans to tell his father but Phillipe prevents it from happening since he likes it in England. In the French dub, he is a Canadian (possibly a Quebecer) exchange student. At the end of the series 2 sketches, Philippe is heard saying, "Hypercool!", and at the end of the series 3 sketches, Danny says "I'm gonna (or "I'll") get you, Phillipe Lavavaseur!" Appears in series 2-3.
The Museum of Imagination, where Mr Elevenses and Mr Faraway show unwitting guests imaginary exhibits, then unveil a real one after they storm out. Appears in series 2-3.
The Dinner Lady, who randomly presses the Big Red Button of Doom if any student or staff falls for her traps. In one episode, she is named as Daisy MacLovelypops. Appears in series 2-3.
The Beekeeper who finds people having trouble in life and promises them that "maybe [his] bees can help", but his bees prove unhelpful when they attack him due to removing his gear that would otherwise have protected him. When they attack him, the problem is usually resolved. Appears in series 2-3.
The Office of International World Records, where one guy comes in every day and tries (and fails) to break a record. Appears in series 2-3.
The Hot or Not girls. A group of girls at a bus stop discussing things that are either hot or not, then when the leader does something like drop her ice cream, she would then say it is hot which causes the rest of the girls to do it. In series 3, there are only two girls in a school who say something is hot and after a long debate, declare it is "so not hot". Appears in series 2–3.
The doctor who diagnoses people with weird ailments, such as a paparazzi, or becoming a mime artist. In series 2, the doctor is male, and in series 3, the doctor is female. Shostakovich's Waltz in C Minor can often be heard in the background. Appears in series 2–3.
The Cake Man, who uses every means possible to steal peoples cake. Appears in series 2–3.
The Zombie Games 2009, involving zombies trying to take part in sports but eventually losing some limbs. Only appeared in series 2.
The Noisy Knights, whose armour causes a lot of noise which makes them believe that it's something else. Only appeared in series 2.
Josh, a nervous ghost who has trouble communicating with other people by always spooking them in the process. Only appeared in series 2.
Gerald, a man who usually confuses something for something he usually wants. e.g., giving someone a Mahican instead of a short, back and sides. Appears in series 2–3.
Tammy, a normal girl who is usually interrupted by a storyteller when she is doing something important like attending a wedding. The storyteller reveals something to the public which Tammy knows about, and later claims her to have 'blown it'. Only appeared in series 2.
A man who is playing a sport related video game on a Nintendo Wii has a friend round wanting to join him, but since the man has only one controller, the other guy has brought his own sport equipment which actually interacts with the game and causes the first guy to get hurt. Only appeared in series 2.
A lifeguard who blows his whistle at various people doing things like stepping on cracks or singing off key. Only appeared in series 2.
A group of boy scouts that try to help out a couples life by building things for them inside their own house, e.g. a garden shed. Only appeared in series 2.
A man who proceeds to take handfuls of party food from the buffet table, only to declare that the food is not for him but for someone else, usually a wooden dummy/doll. Only appeared in series 2.

Introduced in Series 3
Jasper the Dog, who always goes missing and is eventually found buying something from a shop or helping some random person
Colin and Malcolm, two overweight aeroplane attendants that eat all of their food for some made-up reason
Eddie Big, a guy with a massive afro who insists that his friend have the biggest possible things
Tony Take It, who lives down the back of the sofa and steals things
Dean the "superhero", whose mother insists he has powers and forces him to wear a silly costume
Remote Control Legs Man, who tries to live an ordinary life despite the fact that his legs require a remote control to move (spin off the Advice Man, specifically the first sketch.)
Clive the clown, a clown lives his normal life, but when he sees a custard pie, he would proceed to throw it on peoples faces off screen while feeling sorry about it later
The Zombie News Network, a news-style insight into daily zombie life. Similar to Zombie Games from series 2.
Sticky Martin, whose hands get stuck to everything
The man who starts complaining about a terrible smell while waiting for a bus, then eventually launching something from his nose 
The Lady Tourist, who tells people where something is (e.g. swimming pool) and tells them to demonstrate the activities there (showing different swim strokes).
Experimenter Boy, a man who tries to sort out his friend's problems by making inventions for him which always backfire.
Simon, a boy who tries many different ideas for a school fete which involves something dangerous.
A man who thinks he bought a mouse trap, then finds out his mistake when his wife sees a mouse and finds out he got a different trap. For example, a Santa Claus trap. The sketch ends with a mouse holding a bit of cheese and laughing. In one sketch he assures her that he did indeed buy a mouse trap, but he bought a giant mouse trap (which traps a 'giant mouse').

One Time Sketches
Sketches that have only appeared in one episode.
A knight (William Andrews) who goes through a metal detector which beeps, he ends up putting his keys and watch in the bowl, and when he goes through the metal detector a second time it stays silent. Series 1, Episode 1
Old Wives' Tales Hospital, where patients have conditions based on old wives' tales, such as having a funny face after the wind changed or square eyes from watching too much television. Series 1, Episode 4
A waiter (Marek Larwood) who eats most of a couple's orders. Series 1, Episode 8
A man (Marcus Brigstocke) who keeps shouting "football." Series 1, Episode 9
A football news and results programme hosted by a man (James Bachman) that usually revolves an announcer (William Andrews) always shouting goal, another man (Marek Larwood) usually doing something else which the host thinks is football related but really it is not, like watching a rugby game instead of a Portsmouth game he was supposed to be covering, and a malfunctioning computer. Series 1, Episode 9
A referee (William Andrews) that runs backwards and forwards and ends up falling over. Series 1, Episode 10
A group of people in a lift, hear a fart sound and then a man (William Andrews) explains that it's his ringtone. When he answers a call, he actually farts. Series 1, Episode 11
A parody of Mastermind with Job man and Goth man as two of the contestants, Job man, as usual, ends up saying he barely knows anything about the topic given and is then chased by the police man offscreen who "warned him about this before" whereas the goth man ends up getting all the questions correct and wins (all the answers were "black"). Series 1, Episode 12

Cast
All cast members appear in every series unless otherwise indicated.

Pixelface

A spin-off series called Pixelface was commissioned by the BBC and featured what the video game characters from the sketch "Backstage Access" get up to in their spare time. It began airing in January 2011.

References

External links
 
 

2000s British satirical television series
2010s British satirical television series
BBC children's television shows
BBC television comedy
BBC television sketch shows
2000s British children's television series
2010s British children's television series
2008 British television series debuts
2011 British television series endings
English-language television shows
Television series by ITV Studios
2000s British television sketch shows
2010s British television sketch shows